Titus Naikuni is a mechanical engineer, businessman and corporate executive in Kenya. He is the chairman of the board of Airtel Kenya and Rift Valley Railways.

Previously, from February 2003 until December 2014, Naikuni served as the group managing director and chief executive officer of Kenya Airways, the national airline carrier.

Background and education
He was born in Kenya, circa 1961. He attended University of Nairobi, graduating with a Bachelor of Science in mechanical engineering. Later, he attended the Harvard Business School’s Management Development Programme (PMD71), in Cambridge, Massachusetts, US. He also holds an honorary doctorate in science that was awarded to him by the Jomo Kenyatta University of Agriculture and Technology, in recognition of his contribution to development.

Career
He joined the Magadi Soda Company in 1979 as a trainee engineer and rose to the positions of managing director of that company in 1995 and managing director of the Magadi Railway Company (a subsidiary of Magadi Soda Company) in 1996.

Between August 1999 and March 2001, Naikuni was a member of a team of Kenyan technocrats, sponsored by the World Bank, who was known as the "Dream Team". These technocrats were engaged by the government to turn around the economy. In this capacity, Naikuni served as permanent secretary in the Ministry of Transport and Communications and was a member of the board of Kenya Airways.

He returned to Magadi Soda Company in April 2001, where he continued to serve as managing director, until his appointment to Kenya Airways in February 2003. Naikuni has extensive boardroom experience, having served on various company boards, including as a member of the board of Brunner Mond (South Africa), as chairman of Kenya Power and Lighting Company and as chairman of Housing Finance Company Limited. He received the Manager of the Year Award in Kenya in 2002.

Other responsibilities
As of February 2016, Naikuni served on the boards of eight companies, including the following:
 AccessKenya Limited
  Airtel Kenya
  Lafarge International Advisory Board
  Servair France
  Tata Chemicals Magadi
  Prudential Life Assurance Kenya
 Rift Valley Railways

See also
 Kenya Airways

References

Kenyan businesspeople
Kenyan engineers
Kenya Airways people
1961 births
Living people